Chakleshwar Singh  was an Indian politician. He was elected to the Lok Sabha, the lower house of the Parliament of India from the Mathura constituency of Uttar Pradesh as a member of the Indian National Congress.

References

External links
  Official biographical sketch in Parliament of India website

1922 births
Indian National Congress politicians from Uttar Pradesh
Lok Sabha members from Uttar Pradesh
India MPs 1977–1979